A textbook is a manual of instruction or a standard book in any branch of study.

Textbook or Textbooks may also refer to:

 "Textbook" (song), a song by We Are Scientists
 The Textbooks, an Iranian documentary film
 Text Book (film), an Indian film in Malayalam language